

Quagmire
Quagmire (Jerome Meyers), a villain from the Squadron Supreme universe and member of the Institute of Evil, first appeared in flashback in Squadron Supreme #4 and fully in Squadron Supreme #5, and was created by Mark Gruenwald.

The character is a mutant with the ability to manipulate the extra-dimensional Darkforce in the form of a thick, dark, viscous tar-like substance. He can open a dimensional interface anywhere within thirty feet of him, and can control the flow of Darkforce from a thin spray of globules to a thick torrent of oozing slime. His darkforce manifestation is extremely adhesive: a sufficient quantity can immobilize beings of significant superhuman strength. He can also apply small quantities of it to his fingertips and toes to scale walls and ceilings. He can shape the Darkforce into animated tendrils or whip them about his person in a psychokinetic tornado.

He and the rest of the Institute of Evil hold the Squadron Supreme's loved ones hostage but are defeated, put through a behavior modification process, and granted full membership in the Squadron.

Quagmire later goes into a coma saving civilians from an industrial accident. While comatose, he interfaces with the Darkforce dimension, drowning Doctor Decibel and flooding the hospital with Darkforce until Hyperion disconnects his life support. Quagmire is sucked into the dimension and presumed dead.

Quagmire eventually enters the mainstream Earth dimension through the Man-Thing's body. This apparently restores his criminal personality, and he battles Quasar and Jennifer Kale.

Quagmire in other media 
Quagmire appears in the Avengers Assemble episode "Hyperion". This version is an A.I. program for the Squadron Supreme's Citadel.

Quake

Clay Quartermain

Quasar

Neutron

Wendell Vaughn

Phyla-Vell

Richard Rider

Avril Kincaid

Quasimodo

Quasimodo is a supervillain, a computer (or "Quasi-Motivational Destruct Organ") created and abandoned by the Mad Thinker. The character was created by Stan Lee and Jack Kirby and first appeared in Fantastic Four Annual #4 (Nov 1966). The Silver Surfer finds the computer and, feeling pity for his desire to be human, grants him a partly organic, semi-humanoid cyborg body. Quasimodo becomes enraged by his feelings of inferiority compared to the Silver Surfer's more perfect body, battles him, and is rendered immobile by the Surfer. Eventually regaining his mobility, Quasimodo comes into conflict with Captain Marvel, the Beast, Spider-Man and Hawkeye, the Fantastic Four, the Galadorian Spaceknight Rom, and finally the Vision, who expels the villain's consciousness into space.

Returning to Earth, Quasimodo sets up shop at a base in Cuba during the "Dark Reign" storyline, where S.H.I.E.L.D. obtains him for Norman Osborn. He enters Osborn's service as an analyst, compiling dossiers on numerous superhumans where he lists each one depending on if they are a threat, should be locked up, or be good allies with Norman. Quasimodo even recommended leading a group if he was to go after Mad Thinker.

During the "Iron Man 2020" event, Quasimodo appears as a member of the A.I. Army. He and H.E.R.B.I.E. raid a Futura Motors testing site and use an un-hibitor to free the robotic crash test dummies. They are attacked by Iron Man whose attack destroys the un-hibitor. Quasimodo, H.E.R.B.I.E, and the robot test dummies flee the area. After Ghost in the Machine sends a message to Mark One about Arno Stark's project that involves putting an end to the A.I. rebellion, Quasimodo and Machinesmith state they need to stay off the Internet. Mark-One claims that they will tweak the transmission and go on the Heist of the Century by raiding Bain Tower. Quasimodo is zapped by Iron Man as he shuts down in Mark One's arms as he makes Mark One promise that the A.I. Army will win their campaign.

Other versions of Quasimodo
Quasimodo appears in the tie-in comic to The Avengers: Earth's Mightiest Heroes.

Queen
The Queen are two different character appearing in American comic books published by Marvel Comics.

Ana Soria
Adriana "Ana" Soria, created by Paul Jenkins and Michael Ryan, first appears in The Spectacular Spider-Man (vol. 2) #15 (August 2004). The result of an American military experiment from World War II with the ability to control humans as minions with powerful pheromones, the Queen seeks revenge for the US government's abandonment, resulting in confrontations with Peter Parker / Spider-Man and the various superhero community in stopping her biological bomb from destroying New York City. The character next appears as the supervillainess behind the "Spider-Island" storyline as the Spider-Queen. She is the benefactor to Miles Warren / Jackal and has two Man-Spider enforcers, the Tarantula and the Spider King. The Queen's ambitious plans where New York's citizens obtain Spider abilities has the Avengers (led by Ms. Marvel and Iron Man) contain New York City, Anti-Venom curing various Spider-People, and Carlie Cooper and Peter investigating the Spider-Flu's cause. Despite Reed Richards's resources preventing people from gaining Spider abilities, various Spider-People mutate into the Man-Spiders which are controlled by the Queen. The Queen uses the Spider King as the Spider-Flu's carrier while sending the Tarantula to poison Horizon Labs' serum developed by Max Modell and Michael Morbius but gets deprived of her two enforcers who get respectively cured, spitefully killing her co-conspirator's various clones in response. The Queen transformed herself into a giant sized Man-Spider when confronted by Agent Venom and Captain Steve Rogers followed by Spider-Man (using Doctor Octopus's Octobots) and Mary Jane Watson curing New York's population which weaken the Queen when confronting New York's superhero community before Kaine Parker (using the "Big Time" Spider-Armor) ultimately slays the Queen, freeing New York from her ambitions.

Ana Soria's powers and abilities
Ana Soria's mutant abilities grant her superhuman strength, telekinesis, sonic scream, and control over the Man-Spiders. Her telepathy allows her to communicate with drones over long distances and telepathically or telekinetically control the Man-Spiders with psychic powers similar to Madame Web, though strong-willed individuals (such as Spider-Man, Spider-Girl and Spider-Woman) are able to resist. Her Spider-Queen form is a giant spider creature who can siphon power from the other Man-Spiders.

All-Mother
The All-Mother, created by Paul Tobin and Pepe Larraz, first appears in Spider-Island: The Amazing Spider-Girl #2 (September 2011). During the "Spider-Island" outbreak, the Insect-esque All-Mother led the Society of the Wasp against the supposed spiders. The All-Mother planned to kill the Spider-powered individuals with a venom. The All-Mother reluctantly team-up with Spider-Girl in stopping the Man-Spiders from advancing on the superheroes fighting the Spider-Queen, however, the Hobgoblin killed her.

Queen in other media
 An unrelated version of the Spider-Queen appeared in the Spider-Woman episode "Return of the Spider-Queen" during which Jessica Drew / Spider-Woman (voiced by Joan Van Ark) is brainwashed.
 Ana Soria / Spider-Queen appears as a playable character in the mobile game Spider-Man Unlimited.

Quicksand
Quicksand is a fictional supervillain, created by Tom DeFalco and Ron Frenz, who first appeared in Thor 392.

A woman of Vietnamese descent, Quicksand was once a scientist working at a nuclear facility. An accident transforms her body into a sand-like substance (similar to Sandman). Pretty and selfish, she has a hard time adjusting to her transformation. She calls herself Quicksand and attacks the nuclear reactor in a rage, hoping to get revenge for the accident and shut it down. Thor confronts her and prevents disaster by using his hammer to transport the entire facility to another dimension, and Quicksand escapes. She is later contacted by Mongoose on behalf of Count Tagar, who wants a cell sample from Thor to create a race of gods. She initially refuses, but is persuaded when Mongoose demonstrates a device which can temporarily transform her back into human form. She barely holds her own in battle, and escapes again once the sample is collected.

Since then, Quicksand has apparently resigned herself to her transformation, even reveling in the power and profit she has enjoyed as a professional super-criminal. She serves for a time with Superia's Femizons, which are later shut down by Captain America and Paladin. Later, Quicksand somehow comes to the attention of the rogue Egyptian god Seth, who sends her, Bison, and Mongoose to steal a sample of Inferno-42 from S.H.I.E.L.D. In the course of this mission, they battle Thunderstrike, S.H.I.E.L.D. agent Alex DePaul, and hero-for-hire Luke Cage. During the battle, a conscience-stricken Bison turns on his partners, defeating Quicksand and saving the life of DePaul, who lets Bison go free in gratitude.

At some point, she is invited to join the Crimson Cowl's Masters of Evil. She accepts, hoping to get rich through their global weather control scheme. The team is defeated and apprehended by the Thunderbolts, and Quicksand is among those remanded to custody.

During the Civil War storyline, Quicksand is once again seen fighting the Thunderbolts, this time in Denver, Colorado, and is once again defeated. When their leader, Baron Zemo, is contacted by Iron Man to hunt down villains so Stark can recruit them into his own team, Quicksand is one of them. After a period of dream manipulation, she becomes part of Thunderbolts Team B and helps arrest the U-Foes in Portland. Assisting her are Thunderbolts veterans Joystick, Blizzard and Fixer.

During the Dark Reign storyline, Quicksand is revealed as a member of the Initiative's new team for the state of Delaware, the Women Warriors. The team later takes part in the assault on Asgard.

She is later sent to the Raft. When Juggernaut destroys the prison she escapes, but is contained by Justice and handed over to the authorities. Later, she and other super-criminals are sent to a prison not fit to contain them. A riot erupts, and Quicksand is key to the brawl until she is defeated by Rogue and Mimic.

Quicksand’s strength, speed, stamina, agility, reflexes, and durability have all been enhanced as a result of exposure to atomic radiation. Her altered body provides her with protection from physical and energy attacks. She has the ability to transform into a malleable sand-like substance which can be hardened, dispersed, or shaped according to her will. She can increase her size and mass to an unknown extent when in sand-form, and can manipulate it for various effects. She has used this ability to form hammers, elongate parts of her body, and fire sandblasts. Although Quicksand's body is capable of transforming to human form, she does not appear to be able to initiate this change without artificial assistance.

Quicksilver

Quill

Warpie Quill
This Quill first appeared in Captain Britain (vol. 2) #7 and was created by Jamie Delano and Alan Davis. He is one of the Warpies, a group of superhumans created by the Jaspers' Warp. The group was taken in by the British government organization R.C.X. Quill and several other Warpies are trained for combat, forming the Cherubim. They attack Captain Britain, but are later taken in by him and his sister Elizabeth Braddock. The Warpies are later abducted by the new R.C.X. and again came into conflict with Captain Britain, now part of Excalibur. The Warpies were all slowly turning into humans, but the new R.C.X. had told them that they were dying. Excalibur uncovers the truth and tells the Warpies. They also free the original leaders of the R.C.X. and leave the Warpies in their care.

The Warpies are again abducted shortly afterwards by Black Air, another government organisation, who experiments on the group in an attempt to keep them superhuman. Their experiments succeeded, but the Warpies are then captured by Mastermind. Under his leadership, the group attacks and destroys most of the Captain Britain Corps. Captain Britain defeats them and turns them into normal humans.

When powered, Quill's body is covered in barbs, and he has razor-sharp claws.

Max Jordan
Quill (Max Jordan), a student at the  Xavier Institute, first appeared in New X-Men: Academy X #1 and was created by Nunzio DeFilippis and Christina Weir. When the students were each assigned to squads, Quill was assigned to Cyclops's. Quill is voted class clown by the students of the Institute.

He is caught trying to steal test answers from the headmaster’s office. Kitty Pryde arranges for him and his accomplices to be mentored by Gambit, but instead of making them see the error of their ways, Gambit teaches them proper theft techniques.

He is killed during William Stryker's attack on the Xavier Institute in the wake of M-Day. His body is seen in a telepathic image Emma Frost used to torment Carol Danvers about her persistence with the Registration Act.

Max is covered in porcupine-like quills that he can shoot from his body or use as a shield.

Other versions of Quill
In the "House of M" storyline, Max is a SHIELD Hellions squad student.

Quill in other media
 A character inspired by Quill and credited as "Kid Omega" appears in X-Men: The Last Stand, portrayed by Ken Leung. The writer/director commentary on the home release clarified that the credits were mistaken and that the character is intended to be "Quill". This version is a member of the Omegas, who join forces with Magneto's Brotherhood in opposing a "mutant cure", only to be killed by Phoenix.
 Quill's voice appears in a voicemail message for Xavier's School for Gifted Youngsters depicted in a bonus feature on the home release of X-Men: Apocalypse.

Meredith Quill

Meredith Quill is the mother of Peter Quill/Star-Lord and the wife of J'son. The Earth-791 version of the character, created by Steve Englehart, Steve Gan and Bob McLeod, first appeared in Marvel Preview #4 (January 1976). The Earth-616 version of the character, created by Brian Michael Bendis and Steve McNiven, first appeared in Marvel Now! Point One #1 (December 2012).

Meredith Quill in Earth-791
While hiking, Meredith sees a spaceship crash near her. She investigates and discovers the human-like alien Jason of Sparta. After nursing him back to health and forming a romantic relationship with him, Jason leaves, not wanting to risk taking Meredith into dangerous territory, and erases her mind so she will not feel sad. A month later, Meredith rekindles her romance with an old acquaintance, Jake Quill, and marries him. When Meredith gives birth to Peter, the planets, sun and moon are aligned, causing his appearance to be noticeably different from Meredith and Jake. Feeling that Meredith has cheated on him, Jake takes the baby from the weakened Meredith and tries to kill him, but suffers a heart attack. Meredith is unable to reach Peter for an hour due to her condition. She raises Peter by herself, living a relatively peaceful and uneventful life until Peter sees a spaceship land while out for a walk. He runs back to his mother and brings her to see the aliens, but they turn out to be evil and kill her, leaving Peter an orphan.

Meredith Quill in Earth-616
When Sta-Lord's story was updated, Meredith's history was also altered. After getting over a bad breakup with her ex-husband Jake, an alien by the name of J'son crashes in front of her house. She nurses him back to health and over time the two fall in love. J'son fixes his ship so he can return to war against the Badoon and leaves behind his element gun as a keepsake. Shortly after he leaves, Meredith realizes she is pregnant, eventually giving birth to Peter. Meredith raises Peter with the help of her friend Lisa Chang, who would train Peter as an adult. The Badoon, hellbent on destroying anyone from J'son's bloodline, return and kill Meredith, but are killed along with her.

Meredith Quill in other media
 An amalgamated incarnation of Meredith Quill appears in Guardians of the Galaxy (2015), voiced initially by Cree Summer and Vanessa Marshall in later appearances. Like the comics incarnation, this version gave birth to Peter Quill following a relationship with J'son, but died in a similar manner as the MCU incarnation (see below).
 Meredith Quill appears in films set in the Marvel Cinematic Universe (MCU), portrayed by Laura Haddock.
 First appearing in Guardians of the Galaxy (2014), she gives Peter Quill a mixtape of her favorite songs before dying of terminal cancer.
 Meredith appears in the prologue of Guardians of the Galaxy Vol. 2, in which it is revealed she pursued a relationship with Ego, who secretly gave her the tumor that killed her.
 Meredith Quill appears in Guardians of the Galaxy: The Telltale Series, voiced by Courtenay Taylor. In a flashback, Peter Quill promises her not to use violence if he confronts bullies. Additionally, she previously encountered Yondu, who took in Peter on her advice. During Peter's apparent death, he sees a vision of Meredith being revived by the Eternity Forge. Following Hala the Accuser's defeat, the player has the option to either have Mantis help Star-Lord make contact with his mother's spirit or to use the last of the Eternity Forge's energy to revive her.

References

Marvel Comics characters: Q, List of